Olpenitz (Danish: Olpenæs) is a part of the town Kappeln in Schleswig-Holstein, Germany, at the mouth of the Schlei firth to the Baltic Sea.

From 1964 until 2006, Olpenitz was the site of one of three major naval bases of the German Navy in the Baltic Sea. Naval units positioned in Olpenitz included  three squadrons of minesweepers and minehunters and various auxiliary vessels. The base was closed end of 2006, with the last vessels being reallocated to Kiel.

There are plans to convert the old harbour basins into private marinas. After the bankruptcy of the initial investor, completion under a new investor is currently envisaged for 2021.

References

Villages in Schleswig-Holstein
Former municipalities in Schleswig-Holstein
German Navy